Joaquim da Silva Ferreira (born 15 April 1937) is a Portuguese middle-distance runner. He competed in the men's 3000 metres steeplechase at the 1960 Summer Olympics.

References

1937 births
Living people
Athletes (track and field) at the 1960 Summer Olympics
Portuguese male middle-distance runners
Portuguese male steeplechase runners
Olympic athletes of Portugal
Place of birth missing (living people)